The men's 60 kilograms (Extra lightweight) competition at the 2014 Asian Games in Incheon was held on 20 September at the Dowon Gymnasium.

Schedule
All times are Korea Standard Time (UTC+09:00)

Results

Main bracket

Final

Top half

Bottom half

Repechage

References

External links
Official website

M60
Judo at the Asian Games Men's Extra Lightweight